The Stirling council area is one of the 32 council areas of Scotland, and has a population of about  ( estimate). It was created under the Local Government etc (Scotland) Act 1994 with the boundaries of the Stirling district of the former Central local government region, and it covers most of Stirlingshire (except Falkirk) and the south-western portion of Perthshire. Both counties were abolished for local government purposes under the Local Government (Scotland) Act 1973.

The administrative centre of the area is the city of Stirling, with the headquarters at Old Viewforth.

The area borders the council areas of Clackmannanshire (to the east), North Lanarkshire (to the south), Falkirk (to the south east), Perth and Kinross (to the north and north east), Argyll and Bute (to the north and north west), and both East and West Dunbartonshire to Stirling's southwest.

The majority of the population of the area is located in its southeast corner, in the city of Stirling and in the surrounding lowland communities: Bridge of Allan and Dunblane to the north, Bannockburn to the immediate south, and the three former coal mining communities of Cowie, Fallin, and Plean, known collectively as the "Eastern Villages".

The remaining 30 percent of the region's population is sparsely distributed across the rural, mainly highland, expanse in the north of the region. The southern half of this rural area comprises the flat western floodplain of the River Forth, bounded on the south by the Touch Hills and the Campsie Fells. North of the glen lie the Trossachs mountains, and the northern half of the region is generally mountainous in character.

The Council

As with all local authorities in Scotland, Stirling Council has a number of multi-member wards electing representatives under the single transferable vote system.

The wards and their councillors are:

Bannockburn (3 Councillors): Alasdair MacPherson (Ind), Margaret Brisley (Lab), Brian Hambly (SNP)
Dunblane and Bridge of Allan (4 Councillors): Douglas Dodds (Con), Robin Kleinman (Con), Alasdair Tollemache (Green), Ewan Dillon (Ind)‡.
Forth and Endrick (3 Councillors): Paul Henke (Con), Rosemary Fraser (SNP), Gerry McGarvey (Lab)
Stirling East (3 Councillors): Bryan Flannagan (Con), Chris Kane (Lab), Gerry McLaughlan (SNP)
Stirling North (4 Councillors): Danny Gibson (Lab), Susan McGill (SNP), Rachel Nunn (Con), Jim Thomson (SNP)
Stirling West (3 Councillors): Neil Benny (Con), Scott Farmer (SNP), Jen Preston (Lab)
Trossachs and Teith (3 Councillors): Martin Earl (Con), Elaine Watterson (Con), Gene Maxwell (SNP)

The council is currently run as a minority administration by Labour, after successful negotiations with the Conservatives. Chris Kane (Lab) was elected as Council Leader, with Councillor Margaret Brisley (Lab) elected as Depute Leader. Councillor Douglas Dodds (Con) is the Provost of Stirling Council.

‡Dillon was elected as a Labour councillor before quitting the party in October 2022.

Settlements

As well as the city of Stirling itself, there are many towns, villages and hamlets spread across the council area, as well as dispersed settlements:

Towns 
 Bannockburn
 Bridge of Allan
 Callander
 Doune
 Dunblane

Villages 
 Aberfoyle
 Ashfield
 Balfron
 Balmaha
 Balquhidder
 Blairlogie
 Blanefield
 Buchlyvie
 Cambusbarron
 Cambuskenneth
 Cowie
 Crianlarich
 Croftamie
 Deanston
 Drymen
 Fallin
 Fintry
 Gargunnock
 Gartmore
 Killearn
 Killin
 Kinlochard
 Kippen
 Milton of Buchanan
 Lochearnhead
 Plean
 Port of Menteith
 Strathblane
 Strathyre
 Thornhill
 Throsk
 Tyndrum

Hamlets 
 Ardchullarie More
 Ardeonaig
 Arnprior
 Auchlyne
 Balfron Station
 Boquhan 
 Buchanan Smithy
 Carbeth
 Dumgoyne
 Gartness
 Inverarnan
 Kilmahog 
 Kinbuck
 Milton
 Mugdock
 Stronachlachar

Dispersed settlements 
 Ardchyle
 Auchtubh
 Blair Drummond
 Brig o' Turk
 Dalmary
 Dalrigh
 Inversnaid
 Rowardennan
 Ruskie

Places of interest
Carse of Lecropt
Culcreuch Castle
Inchmahome Priory (a ruined Augustinian priory on an island in the Lake of Menteith, used as a refuge in 1547 by Mary, Queen of Scots)
Breadalbane Folklore Centre
Cambuskenneth Abbey (formerly the seat of the Scottish Parliament)
Doune Castle
Dunblane Cathedral
Falls of Dochart
Falls of Lochay
Glen Dochart
Glenfinlas
Lake of Menteith
Lecropt Kirk
Loch Achray
Loch Ard
Loch Earn
Loch Lomond and the Trossachs National Park
Loch Katrine (The source of most of the drinking water for the city of Glasgow)
Loch Rusky
Loch Venachar
Moirlannich Longhouse
Queen Elizabeth Forest Park (run by Forestry and Land Scotland)
Scottish Institute of Sport (on the grounds of Stirling University)
Stirling Castle
The University of Stirling
The Trossachs
Wallace Monument
West Highland Way

References

External links

 Stirling Council official website

 
Council areas of Scotland
1975 establishments in Scotland